Nils Hjalmar Odhner (6 December 1884 – 12 June 1973) was a Swedish zoologist who studied mollusks, a malacologist. He was professor of invertebrate zoology at the Swedish Museum of Natural History, Stockholm, and a member of the Royal Swedish Academy of Sciences.

He was the father of ambassador Bengt Odhner (1918–1990).

Taxa
Species named in honor of this malacologist include:
 The white-knight nudibranch Doris odhneri (MacFarland, 1966)
Tritonia nilsodhneri Marcus, 1983
 Bulimulus sp. nov. nilsodhneri

The World Register of Marine Species (WoRMS) lists 490 marine species named by Odhner. Many of these have become synonyms.

References

1884 births
1973 deaths
Swedish malacologists
20th-century Swedish zoologists
Members of the Royal Swedish Academy of Sciences